Martin Johansson (orienteer) may refer to:

 Martin Johansson (orienteer, born 1964), bronze medalist at the world championships in 1991 and 1993
 Martin Johansson (orienteer, born 1984), bronze medalist at the world championships in 2007 and 2008